Igalamela-Odolu is a Local Government Area in Kogi State, Nigeria. It is bordered by the Niger River in the west and Enugu State in the east. Its headquarters are in the town of Ajaka in the north of the area at.

The northeasterly line of equal latitude and longitude passes through the LGA.
 
It has an area of 2,175 km and a population of 148,020 at the 2006 census.

The postal code of the area is 271.

Climate
 In Igalamela-odolu, the rainy season is warm, uncomfortable and cloudy, while the dry season is hot, moist, slightly cloudy. Throughout the year, the temperature usually varies from 65 °F to 90 °F and is rarely below 58 °F or above 94 °F.

References

Local Government Areas in Kogi State